Spike vs Dracula is a comic book limited series based on the Buffy the Vampire Slayer and Angel television series. Initially printed between February and June 2006 as five separate issues, the series was collected as a trade paperback in September 2006. In 2009, it was collected in the Spike Omnibus.

Story description

A Spike story that takes place over the timespan of a century focusing on the long-running rivalry between Spike and Dracula.

Spike vs. Dracula #1

In October 2013, Dracula writes in  his journal. He tells of Magda, a Romanian sorceress he had learned of; a powerful woman who was skilled in transfiguration and hypnosis, and could command the very elements. Dracula sought her out, and became her willing pupil. The girls clan was initially wary of him, but quickly realized that having Dracula as a protector had notable benefits. For years he protected the clan, and watched Magda grow old. She constantly refused his offer of the "gift" of immortality. One night, Dracula visited the clan to find everyone dead. Dracula found Magda's body, and swore revenge on her killer. He saw that she left an image of the attacking vampire clan in a crystal ball: Drusilla, Spike, and Darla.

In a London book store, Spike is marveling at a copy of Dracula. He observes that the book contains detailed information on how to kill vampires. Drusilla remarks that it's convenient; Spike argues that it's very inconvenient for them. The shop owner demands eleven pounds for the book, as it is signed by the author. Spike thinks this price is ridiculous, but Drusilla asks for the book, so Spike pays.

As they walk the streets of London, Spike tries to convince Drusilla to forget about Angelus; since the incident with the gypsies, he believes, they should consider him gone. Elsewhere, Darla is approached by Dracula. Dracula offers to remove Darla's pain if she'll come with him, and Darla, under Dracula's hypnotic thrall, agrees.

Darla takes Dracula back to her townhouse. Dracula is trying to convince Darla to be his bride, when Spike and Dru arrive. Spike confronts Dracula, who is amused by Spike's name. He announces his own name, and Spike produces the novel he had purchased, saying he has a bone to pick. Dracula calls the novel "fabricated rubbish," and throws the book into the fireplace. Darla interjects, telling Spike that accepting Dracula as their new leader is a good way to move on after the loss of Angelus. Spike resents the implication that he'd be an inadequate leader, and demands his eleven pounds from Dracula. Dracula begins to take Dru under his thrall, and Spike angrily attacks. Dracula effortlessly grabs Spike by the throat and throws him into the fire. In flames, Spike leaps from the townhouse window and into the nearby Thames. Later, Drusilla and Darla depart in a carriage with Dracula to be his brides, unaware that Spike is hiding beneath the coach.

One November night, Dracula summons his brides to him. When they arrive, Drusilla begins to speak of a "party" and says that many people are coming with unpleasant gifts. Dracula presents the girls with gifts of his own: two wooden stakes. Using his hypnotic powers, he orders them to pick them up, saying that it is the only way to end the pain of losing Angelus. Just as Dracula is ordering the girls to kill each other, a flaming arrow crashes through the window. A mob is raiding Dracula's mansion, and the girls are able to escape. Dracula finds a letter from Spike left in their place, saying that he had attacked the village and led the angry mob to the mansion. He concludes the letter with, "P.S.: You still owe me eleven pounds."

Spike vs. Dracula #2

In October 1934, Darla reads a letter from Spike. Darla has chosen to remain in Germany while Spike and Drusilla visit America. In the letter, Spike says that they travelled to Los Angeles, where they ran into Dracula, now world-famous as a result of the movie based on him.

In L.A., Spike takes Drusilla to a theatre showing a stage version of Dracula starring Béla Lugosi himself. Drusilla points out that they've met the real Dracula, but Spike argues that Lugosi is far more entertaining. Spike produces two third-row tickets; Drusilla asks if they were expensive, and Spike replies that they cost the original owner his life.

In Poughkeepsie, a boy tells his school class about his trip to see Béla Lugosi in L.A. He had been excited to see the play, even though he didn't realize he'd meet real vampires that night. He insists to his skeptical teacher that the story is true, and continues to explain that he had been seated next to Drusilla. He had spoken with her until his mother told him to "leave the nice lady alone."

Drusilla remarks to Spike that nobody had ever called her a "nice lady" before. Spike begins to respond, but is distracted when he sees that Dracula himself is sitting in the audience. Spike watches him closely as he sits, unmoving, throughout the production. After the show, Dracula goes to Lugosi's dressing room and attacks him. Spike intervenes as Dracula prepares to kill the "imposter," and Dracula transforms into a wolf and attacks him. They crash out the window and into the alley below while Lugosi escapes his dressing room, yelling for help. He comes across a bride of Dracula, who intends to drive a stake through Lugosi's heart. Before she can do so, Drusilla interferes, taking the stake and killing the vampire.

In the alley, Dracula morphs into a giant bat and takes off, but Spike grabs hold of his leg. They fly onto the set of an aviation film, and land on the wings of an airborne biplane. Dracula's cape gets caught in the plane's propeller, and the plane crashes into the Hollywoodland Sign, destroying the final four letters, as Spike kills the pilot and uses his parachute to escape safely.

At the theatre, Drusilla is preparing to turn Lugosi into a vampire when the boy from the third row attacks her with a cross and chases her away. Later, he is being forced by his schoolteacher to write lines on the blackboard promising never to tell monster stories again. The boy, Edward Wood, Junior, pledges to one day make monster movies as he leaves, taking his teacher's angora sweater with him.

Spike vs. Dracula #3

In September 1943, a worried Spike writes a letter to Darla. She has not replied to a letter in some time, so Spike intends to travel to Berlin to find her. He is stopped by a Nazi officer, kills him, and steals his uniform. He enters Darla's apartment, and comes face to face with Dracula, who has been waiting for him. Dracula tells Spike that Darla was taken by a special branch of the secret police that specializes in all things mystical. The same group has taken one of Dracula's brides, a vampiric gypsy woman by the name of Anselina. Dracula had come to the apartment for Darla's assistance in recovering his bride, but was too late. Dracula says that he knows where the women are, but will need help to rescue them. Faced with a common enemy, Spike and Dracula forge an alliance.

Dracula and Spike, still in his officer's attire, approach the Nazi stronghold in a car. They pull the gate guard into the vehicle and coerce him into inviting them into the compound. Spike rams the car through the gates amid machine gun fire from the other guards. A bullet-ridden Spike emerges from the car and attacks. Suddenly, Nazi reinforcements arrive, this time carrying crosses. Spike curses Dracula and the novel that told everyone how to kill vampires, and retreats to a nearby building. Inside, he finds a chained-up werewolf wearing dog tags identifying him as an American soldier by the name of Nathaniel Osborne. Spike frees the werewolf as the soldiers burst in, and escapes in the ensuing chaos.

Outside, he sees that Dracula has assumed the form of a giant bat, and is flying off with Darla and Anselina. Betrayed, Spike steals a Nazi motorcycle and sets off. Back at Darla's apartment, Spike finds a letter from Darla. She has departed for London, while Dracula and his bride have set off for Romania. The letter assures Spike that he will be attended to. Just then, Nostroyev and The Prince of Lies arrive. They explain that Dracula disapproves of what the Nazis have done to his gypsy kin, and so has sent operatives to Berlin on a mission. They are to depart for Madrid, where the Count assures them there will be free virgin blood for all to share. Spike decides to depart with the two vampires.

In a Nazi office, Dracula assures Adolf Hitler that the three vampires suspect nothing. Darla and Anselina had been used as bait so that the Nazis could capture who Dracula describes as the three most formidable vampires, save for himself. In return, Hitler promises to release Dracula's favoured gypsy tribes.

Spike vs. Dracula #4

In June 1959, Spike writes a letter to Darla, who has rejoined The Master. Spike and Drusilla are living in post-war Rome, and enjoying themselves immensely. Spike leaves Dru briefly to find someone to eat, but when he returns she is gone. A friend of Spike's says that she left with "Le Comte." Assuming he means Dracula, Spike takes off to find her, but is drugged and captured by a group of demons. The drug wears off before they reach their destination, and Spike escapes from the trunk of the car transporting him. The demons chase him into the Colosseum, where he attacks and kills them one by one. Spike interrogates the final demon to learn where the Count is keeping Drusilla, but the demon says he has flown to Cyprus. Spike forces the demon to drive him to the airport, and hitches a ride on a statue of Dracula that is being airlifted to the Count's private villa, taking the demon with him.

Spike throws the demon from the statue shortly before they land at Cyprus, and disembarks in the villa, which is filled with statues. Inside he finds Drusilla, playing a harpsichord. Spike angrily scolds Dru for running off with their enemy, and demands to know where the Count is. He enters at that moment, revealing himself to be not Dracula, but Comte de Saint-Germain, who Spike has never met. The Count says it's his two-hundredth birthday, and had invited Drusilla along for company. He had hired the demons to treat Spike to a night of drinks and a midnight swim with Audrey Hepburn and Sophia Loren as payment for the "borrowing" of Drusilla. The Count invites a disappointed Spike to remain and listen to music played by himself and Drusilla. Afterwards, the Count shows Spike and Dru to his private airstrip, promising to have them back in Rome before sunrise. Dru thanks Spike for not killing Saint-Germain, and Spike smashes the statue of Dracula as retribution for the inconvenience of being kidnapped. As they leave, Spike wishes he could do that to the real Dracula one day.

Behind them, mist emerges from the broken statue and Dracula solidifies inside, behind the Count's back. He has been imprisoned by the Count for twelve years, and he is finally able to take his revenge.

Spike vs. Dracula #5

In November 2003, the Los Angeles branch of Wolfram & Hart receives a letter from Count Vlad Dracula. Dracula lost a $2.7 million mansion when Sunnydale was destroyed, and the firm has not replied to Dracula's inquiries, so he intends to pay a personal visit.

At Wolfram and Hart, Spike is ecstatic when he hears of Dracula's impending visit. He begs Angel to let Dracula believe that Spike's incorporeal form is not bound to the W&H offices, and therefore can haunt Dracula for eternity. Angel agrees to let Spike torment Dracula, on the condition that Spike leave Angel alone for a full month.

Dracula arrives and meets with Angel, where they discuss the difficulties of Dracula's case. The insurance company hasn't classified the city's destruction of Sunnydale as an earthquake, and so he has no coverage. As Dracula demands to know the true cause of Sunnydale's collapse, Spike appears in a chair behind him. Dracula lunges for Spike immediately, passing right through him and tumbling to the floor. Spike demands the eleven pounds Dracula owes him, and taunts Dracula with the fact that both he and Angel have slept with Buffy. He goes on to mention that Angel killed a gypsy girl in a clan Dracula had been fond of a century ago, leading to the slaughter of the entire clan. An enraged Dracula throws Angel through his office door and into the lobby.

Dracula morphs into a wolf and attacks Angel, but is thrown into the doors of the elevator, where Knox and Fred are standing. Dracula changes to his mist form and rematerializes behind the two, tossing Knox aside and taking Fred hostage. Spike makes the mistake of saying that Fred is the only one who can make him solid again, and Dracula prepares to kill her on the spot. Spike, however, threatens to haunt Dracula forever if he does so, and Dracula releases her. Dracula sneers that Spike is common and unworthy, and asks who was responsible for his creation. Upon discovering that it's Angel, Dracula decides that he is a far more worthy enemy. He formally apologizes to Fred for the hostage situation, and announces that he will be seeking other legal representation. He tells Spike that the business between the two of them is concluded, and tells Angel that 'their' business has only just begun. He then vanishes in a cloud of mist. Spike is furious at Angel for "stealing" his nemesis, and Angel replies that there's always The Immortal. Spike exclaims that The Immortal is also Angel's nemesis, and that Dracula is far more famous.

Dracula is riding in the back of his limousine when Spike emerges from the steering column, startling the driver. The car crashes, and Spike tells Dracula that when the police arrive, they'll drag him out into the sun. He orders Dracula to admit that Spike is his nemesis, but Dracula escapes into the sewer.

That night, Spike meets Dracula as he emerges from a manhole. He demands his eleven pounds, which is compensation for a copy of Dracula that Vlad had burned a hundred years ago. Dracula sneers that not only did Spike pay a ridiculous sum for the book at the time, but now that he is demanding compensation he is failing to consider the value of the book today, or even the effect of inflation on the original price. Spike says he doesn't care about any of that, he just wants what's his. He had only bought the book because Drusilla wanted it. Dracula smiles and says that "love makes fools of us all." He produces twenty American dollars - the equivalent of eleven British pounds - and throws it to the street. He then transforms into a bat and flies away as Spike mocks him. As Spike gloats about being the winner, he reaches down to pick up the money, and his hand passes right through it.

Writing and artwork

The penciller credited for the first three issues was Joe Corroney. Issue #4 credits Corroney for pages 1–4 and Mike Ratera for pages 5–22. Issue #5 credits Zach Howard for pages 1–11 and Nicola Scott for pages 12–22.
Cover artists for the comics were Joe Corroney Zach Howard, Sean Murphy, and Eric Wight. Tyler Walpole replaced Wight for issue #5. Each issue also had its own photographic cover featuring actor James Marsters.

Missing dialogue

When Spike vs Dracula #1 was originally released, due to an error in editing/printing, page 21 was missing its dialogue. The missing text was revealed at Peter David's official site in April 2006.

Reviews

"SPIKE VS DRACULA TRADE PAPERBACK", Fractalmatter.com (2006).

References

Angel (1999 TV series) comics
Comics by Peter David
2006 comics debuts
IDW Publishing titles